Adriana Golombek Wagner (born October 16, 1975) is a Brazilian television presenter.

Biography 
Didi Wagner was born in São Paulo, Brazil. She is Jewish, a descendant of German Jews who immigrated to Brazil fleeing the war.

Filmography

Television

References

External links

 

1975 births
Living people
People from São Paulo
Brazilian people of German-Jewish descent
Brazilian television presenters
Brazilian Jews